Bönningstedt was an Amt ("collective municipality") in the district of Pinneberg, in Schleswig-Holstein, Germany. Its seat was in Bönningstedt. In January 2007, it was merged with the Amt Pinneberg-Land to form the Amt Pinnau.

The Amt Bönningstedt consisted of the following municipalities (population in 2005 between brackets):

Bönningstedt
Ellerbek 
Hasloh 

Former Ämter in Schleswig-Holstein